Algernon St. Maur, 15th Duke of Somerset, etc. (22 July 1846 – 22 October 1923, in Maiden Bradley) was the son of Algernon St. Maur, 14th Duke of Somerset and Horatia Morler. He was also a baronet.

On September 5, 1877, he married Susan Margaret Richards Mackinnon, the ninth daughter of Charles Mackinnon of Corriechatachan, but the marriage was childless.

He was educated at Britannia Royal Naval College, but later joined the 60th Rifles and took part in the Wolseley Expedition of 1870. He was a tall and athletic man, of powerful build. After leaving the Regular Army, he spent several years ranching in Western America. On accession to the Dukedom in 1894, he voted often in the House of Lords, although he seldom spoke there. He became president of Dr Barnardo's Homes, a charity which both he and the Duchess had supported for many years.

When Somerset died in 1923, he left no son, and his brothers Lord Ernest and Lord Edward had both recently died childless, so his titles and estates were inherited by the nearest heir, his distant cousin Colonel Edward Seymour.

The Duke was buried on Brimble Hill Clump near his main residence at Bradley House, Maiden Bradley, Wiltshire. His widow was also buried there when she died in 1936. Their graves are in a little wood on a hilltop surrounded by agricultural land, with a metal fence around them, and marked by standing rough stones with small text plaques.

Ancestry

References

Morier family ancestry

External links
Algernon Seymour, 15th Duke of Somerset

1846 births
1923 deaths
Burials in Wiltshire
515
Algernon Seymour, 15th Duke of Somerset
King's Royal Rifle Corps officers
People of the Red River Rebellion
British landowners
International Olympic Committee members